Members of the New South Wales Legislative Assembly who served in the 49th parliament held their seats from 1988 to 1991. They were elected at the 1988 state election, and at by-elections. The Speaker was Kevin Rozzoli.

See also
First Greiner ministry
Results of the 1988 New South Wales state election (Legislative Assembly)
Candidates of the 1988 New South Wales state election

References

Members of New South Wales parliaments by term
20th-century Australian politicians